The 1947 San Francisco Dons football team was an American football team that represented the University of San Francisco as an independent during the 1947 college football season. In its first and only season under head coach Edward McKeever, the team compiled a 7–3 record and outscored opponents by a total of 275 to 143.

Schedule

References

San Francisco
San Francisco Dons football seasons
San Francisco Dons football